The Class 3000 (C3K class) is a class of diesel multiple unit in service with NI Railways.

History
At the beginning of the 21st century, the majority of rail services in Northern Ireland continued to be operated using Class 80 DEMUs, which had been in service since the mid-1970s, and were becoming increasingly harder to maintain. NIR had not procured new rolling stock since 1994, when, in conjunction with Iarnród Éireann, it purchased locomotives and coaches for the Enterprise service.

As part of a major investment programme in the railways in Northern Ireland, NI Railways placed an order totalling £80 million, the largest single investment in rolling stock ever made by NIR, with CAF for 23 3-car DMUs in 2002.

The new trains entered service in 2004 and 2005, gradually replacing most of the existing Class 80 units  on the network (the main exception being services between Belfast and Larne, which were still provided by the Class 450 DMUs). The trains are capable of speeds of up to 145 km/h (90 mph), seat 201 (including 15 on tip-up seats) and have standing room for 280 passengers crush laden. The sets are numbered 3001-3023. All vehicles are powered. The individual cars are 3301 to 3323, 3501 to 3523 and 3401 to 3423. The end vehicles on each unit have cabs. 3001 is formed 3301-3501-3401 up to 3023 being formed 3323-3523-3423.

The first six units (3001-3006) are fitted with CAWS and communication equipment compatible with the rail network in the Republic of Ireland. This enables these units to be used as required on cross-border services.

Accidents and incidents
On Thursday 2nd August 2007, unit 3014 hit a tractor, killing the tractor driver, and severely damaging the front of the train (3414).

The leading vehicle (3413) was severely damaged and a passenger was injured. The unit 3013 was returned to revenue service in November 2018.

On Friday 9th August 2019, No. 3019 hit a tree just south of Antrim, damaging the front of the train (3414).

On Wednesday 18th December 2019, No. 3006 hit a tree near Mossley West, severely damaging the leading vehicle, 3406.

Refurbishment
Phase 1 of the refurbishment programme was begun during the financial year 2009/10 and cost an estimated £1.2 million. At the time, the trains were approximately 5–6 years old.  By the time this was completed, the 20 new Class 4000 units were already coming into service. The refurbishment involved re-liverying the trains in the refreshed corporate branding. NI Railways has also started to refurbish its Class 3000 in November 2018, and is scheduled to refurbish all the twenty-three 3000's. The refurbishment program is expected to run until 2021.

Fleet details

Gallery

References

3000
CAF multiple units